The Eppley Institute for Research in Cancer and Allied Diseases is a research institute at the University of Nebraska Medical Center in Omaha, Nebraska, United States. Dedicated in 1963, the mission of the Eppley Institute is to "Develop superior research programs that will provide a better understanding of the causes of cancer, improve the methods for diagnosis of cancer and improve the methods for the treatment and prevention of cancer and similar disorders".

About

The Eppley Institute is part of the University of Nebraska Medical Center and The Nebraska Medical Center. It has access to 734 licensed beds and handles 22,000 inpatient admissions yearly for approximately 3,600 new cancer patients annually. 164 Cancer Center members, including 61 practicing physicians, are involved in basic, clinical, and population-based research and are awarded approximately $20 million in peer-reviewed research grants annually.

History

Originally built with a grant from the Eugene C. Eppley Foundation, the Institute was founded in 1960 with support from the National Institutes of Health and the University of Nebraska Medical Center (UNMC). Dr. Henry M. Lemon was the first director. In 1968, Dr. Philippe Shubik's research group moved to UNMC from the Chicago Medical School to continue their focus on the study of chemical carcinogenesis. The Eppley Institute became an independent research institute in 1972 with an act from the Nebraska Legislature.  In 1973 the Institute grew by 30,000 feet with the addition of the Eppley Hall of Science, which was funded by the Eppley Foundation and the National Cancer Institute.

The American Cancer Society awarded the Eppley Institute a "Special Institutional Grant in Cancer Cause and Prevention" in 1988. This award is one of only seven such awards in the nation, recognizing the achievements of the investigators at the Eppley Institute in this field.

Notability
Eppley is an internationally recognized cancer research center that is well-reputed for its treatments of hematological malignancies, particularly lymphomas and leukemia. Its basic research programs in chemical carcinogenesis; molecular, cellular, and structural biology; and translational research in novel therapies are well-noted, as well. It is considered to be a Center of Excellence for the study of lymphoma, and Eppley's expertise in the field of transplantation began with bone marrow transplantation in 1983.

Education

Cancer Research Doctoral Program - National Cancer Institute-supported T32 Cancer Biology Training Program  that trains future scientists to approach cancer research knowledgeably and creatively and to make significant contributions in the cancer field in their future careers.  The faculty members of the Cancer Research Doctoral Program have primary appointments in many departments and institutes at UNMC, such as the Eppley Institute, the Pharmaceutical Sciences Department, the Oral Biology Department, and several departments in the College of Medicine (the Biochemistry & Molecular Biology Department, the Genetics, Cell Biology & Anatomy Department, and the Pathology & Microbiology Department).

See also
 Hospitals in Omaha, Nebraska
 Colleges and universities in Omaha, Nebraska

References

External links
 Official website

Organizations established in 1960
Cancer organizations based in the United States
University of Nebraska Medical Center
Medical research institutes in the United States
NCI-designated cancer centers